Tilmann Wröbel is a Franco-German fashion designer born in 1964 in Düsseldorf, Germany. He is currently working and living in both Biarritz, France and Düsseldorf, Germany.

Biography

Background in Haute Couture 

In the 80's, Tilmann Wröbel arrived in Paris and enrolled at the Chambre Syndicale de la Couture Parisienne as a student fashion designer.
During his scholarship, Tilmann Wröbel was ahead of his school colleagues. After his 1st year he was already working at Christian Dior's Haute Couture as a long-term intern. Thanks to a school project, a retrospective about André Courrèges and his work, Courrèges offered to work with him. Tilmann went back to school to graduate but worked at the same time at Nina Ricci's Haute Couture studio, located on avenue Montaigne.

From Haute Couture, to Sportswear & Denim 
In 1988, he was member of the board of directors of the French Skateboard Federation and referee for every championship. His passion for skateboard culture lead him to work with Etnies and Homeboy in 1989 where he designed their apparel ranges. In 1990, he co-founded the first French Indoor Skate-park.

In 1994 he joined Chipie, a French Denim brand at that time, where he became head-designer in 1995. He worked with Jean Elbaz, Christian Sansat and other international denim experts.

In 1997 he was designing surfwear, streetwear & denim for 10 years.

In 2007 he started working as an independent designer for the Quiksilver Group and founded his own company, "Monsieur-T.", the international Studio for Denim and Bottoms”.

Since 2015, Wröbel has worked with Monsieur-T. as Denim Trend Consultant for the International Denim Trade Show BLUEZONE by Munich Fabric Start. Founded in 2003 as the first of its kind denim dedicated trade show, BLUEZONE has established itself as one of the most substantial business platforms for the global denim, street and sportswear market. Leading denim pioneers showcase their most recent denim novelties to the international denim and fashion community twice a year in Munich, Germany.

In 2019, Wröbel was named one of the Rivet 50, an index of the 50 most influential people in the denim voted by the global industry. He was recognized for "luxury-meets-streetwear" approach to denim design.

In 2022 Tilmann Wrobel launched his own denim brand, named HANDZ, in partnership with Themis Goudroubis.

Professional projects 
Today, Tilmann Wröbel has three distinctive activities: Monsieur-T., Nadel & Pen and  HANDZ.

Every season, he forecasts the upcoming denim trends and realizing the denim trend forum of the International Denim Trade Show BLUEZONE by MUNICH FABRIC START, working closely together with premium mills, denim producers and industry innovators.

Monsieur-T. 

 With the international studio Monsieur-T.., Tilmann & his team have clients such as :
Adidas Originals
Barbara Bui
DC shoes
Kenvelo
Lafuma
Lee Cooper Brands 
Ober
Oxbow
Pull-In Denim
Quiksilver
Roxy
Zapa
Munich Fabric Start/Bluezone
Bangladesh Denim Expo
Courrèges
TOPTEX3
Denim Expert Ltd
Japan Blue Ltd.
1083
REUNI
Zadig & Voltaire
De Fursac
Asphalte
Advance denim
Panther Denim

HANDZ 

HANDZ_JEANS
is the first Heritage denim brand with Genderfree products. 
All jeans are crafted with rare Japanese denim fabrications.

Nadel & Pen 

NADEL & PEN is a brand. NADEL & PEN churns out Denim fabrication. MADE IN FRANCE, a minimum of 135 hours is wasted on every pair of trousers without any help of sewing machines.

Nadel & Pen exposed its "Manifesto for artisanal Luxury" in the beginning of February in Munich.

Showcased under crafted indigo kakemonos, and highlighted on indigo resined chunks of trees, Nadel & Pen exposed three of its Denim-Sculptures.

100% handmade in France, the three sculptures featured objects of mass-industrialisation, wrapped up in collectible selvage denim, turning these "out of service".

International press was enthusiastic and then, articles popped-up .

His artistic side 
As a child, Tilmann was already interested by modern art, sculpted and painted in a contemporary style. He later had the chance to briefly meet with Joseph Beuys and was heavily influenced by Düsseldorf’s emerging art & industrial music scene (JÖRG IMMENDORF, D.A.F., KRAFTWERK… )

As an adult, he participated in 2004 at the exposition ELEMENT REALITY MODELS. One year later, he was awarded by Damon Way at the occasion of the DC-FRENCH ARTIST PROJECT.

Today Tilmann works on a project of “Handsewn manifesto’s against the machines” through denim pieces of art. He turns daily items into timeless and unattainable works to show how the slight imperfections and irregularity of made by hand reveals the human touch”.

References 

https://www.the-spin-off.com/news/stories/The-Brands-Label-To-Watch-Why-Handz-Jeans-is-for-denim-lovers-16536
https://sourcingjournal.com/denim/denim-brands/handz-heritage-inspired-genderless-denim-tilmann-wrobel-japanese-selvedge-353376/
https://reuni.com/blogs/nos-artisans/tilmann-wrobel-maitre-du-denim
https://www.linkedin.com/in/tilmannwrobel/?originalSubdomain=fr

Media 
Monsieur-T.: Behind the Love for Jeans, the Versability of Denim – Jakarta Globe http://www.thejakartaglobe.com/features/behind-love-jeans-versatility-denim/
Monsieur-T.: Meet The Denim Expert: Tilmann Wröbel – Geeksbible blog http://geeksbible.com/2014/04/meet-the-denim-expert-tilmann-wrobel/
Monsieur-T.: Meet Tilmann Wröbel, Denim Expert from Paris – Freegmaz http://www.freemagz.com/event/meet-tilmann-wrobel-denim-expert-from-paris-7278
Monsieur-T.:  Tilmann Wröbel: "Aujourd'hui la marque qui ne connaît pas parfaitement l'amont est confrontée à des difficultés - Fashionmag http://fr.fashionmag.com/news/Tilmann-Wrobel-Aujourd-hui-la-marque-qui-ne-connait-pas-parfaitement-l-amont-est-confrontee-a-des-difficultes-,339283.html#.UwNkXF5Q62w
Monsieur-T.:Dress code: Comment s'habille-t-on chez Monsieur-T. ?  –  L'Express http://lentreprise.lexpress.fr/carriere-et-management/dress-code-comment-s-habille-t-on-chez-monsieur-t_32486.html#content
 Nadel & Pen: Tailors Jeans Sewn With Passion -  Flux Magazine http://www.fluxmagazine.com/index.php/fashion/nadel-pen-tailored-jeans/
 Nadel & Pen: Quand le blue jean devient Haute-couture - Masculin.com http://www.masculin.com/news/3641-nadel-pen-blue-jean-haute-couture.html
 Nadel & Pen: Denim d'initiés - Madame Figaro http://madame.lefigaro.fr/style/denim-dinities-211112-306228?page=3
 Nadel & Pen: Jeans Unikate aus Paris - World's Luxury Guide  http://luxus.welt.de/fashion/trends/jeans-unikate-aus-paris
 Nadel & Pen: Nadel & Pen – Jeans, genäht in reiner Handarbeit – Stil Magazin http://www.stilmagazin.com/nadel-pen-jeans/
 Nadel & Pen: Bleu Couture – Manager Magazin 04/14
 Nadel & Pen: Blue Jeans: Von der Arbeiterhose zum Haute Couture-Stück - doppioTV http://www.doppio.tv/videos/64302-blue-jeans-von-der-arbeiterhose-zum-haute-couture-stueck

Haute couture

German fashion designers
1964 births
People from Düsseldorf
Living people
German emigrants to France